The 2014 Carolina RailHawks season was the club's eighth season of existence, and their fourth consecutive season in North American Soccer League, the second division of the American soccer pyramid.

The season followed the Spring/Fall format adopted by the NASL in 2013 with the Spring season starting on April 12 and lasting for 9 games until June 8, while the Fall season would begin the night before the 2014 World Cup Final on July 12 and lasted 18 games until November 1. The winner of the Spring championship would again host the 2014 Soccer Bowl.

Competitions

Pre-season and Exhibitions

Pre-season

Exhibitions

NASL Spring Season

The Spring season lasted for 9 games beginning on April 12 and ending on June 8. The schedule featured a single round robin format with each team playing every other team in the league a single time. Half the teams would host 5 home games and play 4 road games whereas the other half of the teams would play 4 home games and 5 road games.

Standings

Results

Results by round

Match reports

NASL Fall Season

The Fall season lasted for 18 games beginning on July 12 and ending on November 1. The schedule featured a double round robin format with each team playing every other team in the league twice, one at home and one on the road. The winner of the Fall season played the winner of the Spring season in the Soccer Bowl 2014 Championship game except if the Spring and Fall Champions are the same team in which case the team with the best overall Spring and Fall record behind that team would be their opponent.

Standings

Results

Results by round

Match reports

U.S. Open Cup

The RailHawks will compete in the 2014 edition of the Open Cup.

References

North Carolina FC seasons
Carolina Railhawks Football Club
2014 in sports in North Carolina